Elisabeth of Cleves was the daughter of Adolph I, Duke of Cleves and Marie of Burgundy, Duchess of Cleves. She married Count Henry XXVI of Schwarzburg-Blankenburg, on July 15, 1434.

Children
Together, they had eleven children:
Günther XXXVI (July 8, 1439 – Rudolstadt, December 30, 1503);
Henry XXVII (November 13, 1440 – December 14, 1496), Archbishop of Bremen;
Catherine (February 2, 1442 – November 9, 1484), married Busso VII of Mansfeld and Sigmund I of Gleichen-Tonna;
Günther XXXVII (June 8, 1443);
Henry XXVIII (January 8, 1447 – Bremen, 1481), Canon in Cologne and Mainz;
Günther XXXVIII (Rudolstadt, 1450 – Bremen, November 29, 1484) married Catherine of Querfurt and Anna of Gleichen;
Henry XXIX (August 10, 1452 – March 31, 1499), Canon at Hildesheim;
Günther XXXIX (May 30, 1455 – Arnstadt, August 8, 1521), married Amalia of Mansfeld;
Heinrich XXX (December 31, 1456 – Arnstadt, June 12, 1522), Canon in Strasbourg and Jechasburg;
Maria (June 16, 1458);
Mary (November 4, 1459 – December 1459).

See also
Duchy of Cleves

References

1420 births
1488 deaths
People from the Duchy of Cleves
House of La Marck